Art of Fighting is a 2006 South Korean action comedy drama film co-written and directed by Shin Han-sol. The film was released to Korean theaters on January 5, 2006, and had 1,313,727 tickets nationwide.

Synopsis
Song Byeong-tae is bullied all the time in the small technical school he attends, until one day, he encounters and befriends Oh Pan-su, an old gangster-like man who hides in plain sight from the law, and whose fighting skills astound Byeong-tae, who asks the man to teach him to fight. He soon learns the true meaning and virtues of fighting as he finally goes against these bullies one by one and then after the toughest bully in the school, using the skills the man, whose name he doesn't even know, has taught him. Byeong-tae's father, on the other hand, is a distant police officer who suddenly starts taking a closer look at his son's new friend, eventually bringing consequences for everyone involved.

Cast
 Baek Yoon-sik - Oh Pan-su
 Jae Hee - Song Byeong-tae
 Kim Eung-soo - Byeong-ho / Byeong-ho's father
 Choi Yeo-jin - Young-ae
 Park Won-sang - Section chief Ahn 
 Hong Seung-jin - Pako
 Park Ki-woong - Jae-hoon
 Jeon Jae-hyung - Boong-eo
 Kwon Byung-gil - Assi
 Son Byeong-wook - Yong-ho
 Kim Young-hoon - "White Shark"
 Jo Sung-ha

References

External links
 
 
 

2006 films
2000s Korean-language films
South Korean action comedy-drama films
2006 action comedy films
2006 action drama films
2000s action comedy-drama films
2000s South Korean films